The Guangzhou Broadcasting Network, also known as GZBN, is a municipally-owned television network in Guangzhou, Guangdong, People's Republic of China. The television department made its first broadcast on 10 January 1988, while radio department made its first broadcast on 1 December 1991. The GZBN is also owns a cable company and a showbiz newspaper, and owns Sky Link TV in the US.

Television 

Guangzhou TV General: launched on 1988 with news, TV series, entertainment, lifestyle and public affairs programming. Available in SD and HD since February 2018.
Guangzhou TV News: launched on 1992 with local news and documentaries. Available in SD and HD since February 2018.
Guangzhou TV Drama: launched on 1994 with TV series, currently airs Canto-dubbed series. Available in SD and HD
Guangzhou TV Sport: launched on 1994 with simulcasts of Star Sports Network, now the partner and home broadcaster of local basketball team Guangzhou Long-Lions. Available in SD and HD
Guangzhou TV Legal: launched on 1994 with the name Guangzhou TV Economic, currently airs Mandarin TV series and legal programming. Available in SD and HD
Guangzhou TV Ultra HD: Mandarin-language 4K TV channel launched on 2020 to replace Kids, Lifestyle and Shopping channels. The channel is the first UHD channel owned by a Chinese municipal broadcaster.

Defunct channels 

Guangzhou TV Lifestyle: on air between 1994 and 2020, previously airs English-language programming under the name "I Channel" from 2005 to 2014.
Guangzhou TV Kids: airs kids' programming mostly in Mandarin, on air between 2005 and 2020.
Guangzhou TV Shopping: airs teleshopping and infomercials from different companies, on air between 2006 and 2020.
Guangzhou TV Gov: airs government affairs programming, on air between 2016 and 2017, currently serves as a production unit.

Radio 

 News Radio (FM 96.2MHz): News and talk format
 Car Music Radio (FM 102.7MHz): music format
 Traffic Radio (FM 106.1MHz & AM 1098kHz): traffic updates, also served as the emergency broadcasting service  "Guangzhou Emergency Radio"
 Teens Radio (FM 88.0MHz & AM 1170kHz): music format under the My FM China branding, also known as "Guangzhou My FM88.0"

Controversies 

In a New Year's Eve programming produced by the network in 2015, one performance from a local musical play about Cantonese opera came under fire in the community over its use of Mandarin language.

A video report edited by the network's social media team were claimed "misleading" by medical personnel during the 2019–20 coronavirus pandemic over steaming medical masks for re-use.

See also 
 Guangdong Radio and Television - using the name Guangzhou Television from 1959 to 1979
 Guangzhou TV Tower

References

External links 
 

Television networks in China
Television stations in China
Mass media in Guangzhou
Television channels and stations established in 1988
1988 disestablishments in China
State media
Government-owned companies of China